Samir Thapar is an Indian rally driver and businessman.

Racing career

Early career
Thapar debuted in the Indian National Rally Championship in 1992.

Viral video
In July 2013, after a ten year break from racing, Thapar participated in the 2013 Indian National Rally Championship alongside co-driver Vivek Ponnusamy. A camera was installed inside the car to record the race, and afterwards, Thapar uploaded the recording to his YouTube channel. Yohann Setna, then a manager at the racing and rally team J.A. Motorsport, downloaded the video and edited it down to a humorous three-and-a-half minute clip of the moments during which Ponnusamy was shouting at Thapar, including phrases such as "Samir, you are breaking the car." The cut-down video was uploaded to Setna's YouTube channel on August 8 and went viral, acquiring over a million views within a few weeks.

Ponnusamy lodged a complaint under Section 66A of the Indian Information Technology Act, which penalizes sending offensive messages. He alleged that the edits portrayed Thapar and himself in a "demeaning manner," and that the video had provoked racially abusive comments and caused him to lose several rally contracts. Setna was arrested on August 24.

Personal life
He is a member of the industrialist Thapar family, being the grandson of Karam Chand Thapar.

References 

1965 births
Living people
Indian businesspeople
Thapar family
Indian rally drivers